Owzrud Rural District is a rural district (dehestan) in Baladeh District, Nur County, Mazandaran Province, Iran. At the 2006 census, its population was 1,811, in 598 families. The rural district has 16 villages.

References 

Rural Districts of Mazandaran Province
Nur County